Bad English was an American/British glam metal supergroup formed in 1987. It reunited Journey keyboardist Jonathan Cain with singer John Waite and bassist Ricky Phillips, his former bandmates in the Babys, along with Journey guitarist Neal Schon and drummer Deen Castronovo.

The band is mainly known for their hit single "When I See You Smile", which peaked at No. 1 on the Billboard Hot 100 in November 1989.

History 
The members decided on a name for the band while playing pool. John Waite missed a shot and Jonathan Cain made a comment on how bad his "" was (referring to the spin a player puts on the cue ball), and the band decided to use the phrase.

Jonathan Cain and guitarist Neal Schon, members of the successful rock band Journey, formed Bad English with Waite after Journey disbanded. They were joined by Ricky Phillips, who had played bass for the Babys on two albums with Waite and Cain, and drummer Deen Castronovo.

First album
The band's first album, Bad English, was a big seller. It contained three top-40 hit singles: the number one hit "When I See You Smile", the top 10 hit "Price of Love", and "Possession". 

The album's first single, however, was "Forget Me Not." It stalled outside the Top 40 at #45, but the single peaked at #2 on the Mainstream Rock chart. The second single, "When I See You Smile", was their biggest hit, peaking at #1 on the Hot 100. The song is also notable for being the only song entirely written by an outside writer without help from at least one member in the band, besides "Don't Walk Away". "Best of What I Got" was released as a promotional single to Rock Radio, where the tune cracked the top 10.

From March to June 1990, the band toured across the US with glam metal band Whitesnake in support of the album.

Second album
The band's second album, Backlash, came and went without any fanfare. The only single, "Straight to Your Heart," missed the Top 40, peaking at No. 42. Ricky Phillips writes on his website that the group had parted company before the second album had been mixed. Both Phillips and guitarist Neal Schon expressed frustration with the "pop" side of the band's songs and wanted a harder edge. In the end, it proved to be the band's undoing as everyone left to pursue other projects.

Breakup & Aftermath
In later interviews, Waite revealed that although he loved playing to stadium-sized audiences, he was uncomfortable with the corporate rock image that he felt the band had presented. He returned to working as a solo artist. Schon and Castronovo joined the fledgling rock band Hardline in 1991; however, both would leave the group not long after the release of its debut album, with Schon pursuing other projects and Castronovo joining Ozzy Osbourne's band.In the mid-1990s, Schon rejoined Cain, who had released two solo albums in the interim, in a reformed Journey.  Castronovo also joined Journey in 1998, eventually leaving in 2015.  He later became a member of the Dead Daisies and Revolution Saints before returning to Journey in 2021.  Meanwhile, Phillips returned to session work, recording with artists such as Coverdale/Page, Bobby Kimball, and Eddie Money, before joining Styx in the early 2000s.

In popular culture
"Best of What I Got" from the band's first album, is featured during the credits to the 1989 movie Tango & Cash, starring Sylvester Stallone and Kurt Russell.

Band members
 John Waite - lead vocals, rhythm guitar
 Neal Schon - lead guitar, backing vocals
 Jonathan Cain - keyboards, piano, rhythm guitar, backing vocals
 Ricky Phillips - bass, backing vocals
 Deen Castronovo - drums, percussion, backing vocals

Discography

Studio albums

Compilation albums

Singles

See also
List of glam metal bands and artists

References

1987 establishments in California
1991 disestablishments in California
Epic Records artists
Glam metal musical groups from California
Hard rock musical groups from California
Heavy metal musical groups from California
Heavy metal supergroups
Musical groups established in 1987
Musical groups disestablished in 1991
Rock music supergroups